Parliamentary elections were held in Djibouti on 18 December 1992. They were the first elections following a referendum in September that reintroduced multi-party democracy, albeit with a limit of four parties, although they were boycotted by the Front for the Restoration of Unity and Democracy. The ruling People's Rally for Progress won 75% of the vote and all 65 seats in the National Assembly. Voter turnout was only around 48.5%, as many Afars did not vote.

Results

References

Djibouti
Parliamentary
Elections in Djibouti
Djibouti